Colin D. Woodroffe is an Australasian geographer and coastal geomorphologist currently serving as professorial fellow at the University of Wollongong. He is the coordinator of the GeoQuEST Research Centre. His international research focuses on the morphology, stratigraphy and sedimentary dynamics of tropical and subtropical coasts, and the application of Geographical Information Systems (GIS) to the study of processes and change in the coastal zone.

He has researched the following:
 Morphodynamics of estuaries and deltas
 Reef morphology and sedimentation
 Coral paleoclimatology and ocean circulation
 Reef island evolution and climate change

In 2007, he was admitted to Doctor of Science at Cambridge University.

Publications
 Woodroffe, C.D., B. Samosorn, Q. Hua, and D.E. Hart (2007) "Incremental accretion of a sandy reef island over the past 3000 years indicated by component-specific radiocarbon dating". Geophysical Research Letters, 34: L03602, .
 Woodroffe, C.D. (2007) "Critical thresholds and the vulnerability of Australian tropical coastal ecosystems to the impacts of climate change". Journal of Coastal Research, Special Issue, vol. 50: pp. 469–473.
 Woodroffe, C.D., Kennedy, D.M., Brooke, B.P. and Dickson, M.E. (2006) "Geomorphological evolution of Lord Howe Island and carbonate production at the latitudinal limit to reef growth". Journal of Coastal Research, vol. 22: pp. 188–201.
 Woodroffe, C.D., Nicholls, R.J., Saito, Y., Chen, Z. and Goodbred, S.L. (2006) "Landscape variability and the response of Asian megadeltas to environmental change". Global Change and Integrated Coastal Management: The Asia-Pacific Region, Springer, pp. 277–314.
 Woodroffe, C.D., Kennedy, D.M., Jones, B.G. and Phipps, C.V.G., 2004. "Geomorphology and Late Quaternary development of Middleton and Elizabeth Reefs". Coral Reefs, vol. 23: pp. 249–262.
 Woodroffe, C.D. (2003) Coasts, form, process and evolution. Cambridge University Press, 623pp.
 Woodroffe, C.D., Beech, M.R. and Gagan, M.K. (2003) "Mid-late Holocene El Nino variability in the equatorial Pacific from coral microatolls". Geophysical Research Letters, vol. 30, pp. 1358–1361.
 Kennedy, D.M. and Woodroffe, C.D. (2002) "Fringing reef growth and morphology: a review". Earth-Science Reviews, vol. 57, pp. 255–277.

External links
 University of Wollongong staff website
 Professor Woodroffe admitted to Doctor of Science
 Australia Department of the Environment report
 CSIRO Marine & Atmospheric Research report (PDF)
 University of Cambridge website

Australian geomorphologists
Australian geographers
Australian scientists
Living people
Academic staff of the University of Wollongong
Year of birth missing (living people)
Place of birth missing (living people)